The Galleria dell'Accademia di Firenze, or "Gallery of the Academy of Florence", is an art museum in Florence, Italy. It is best known as the home of Michelangelo's sculpture David. It also has other sculptures by Michelangelo and a large collection of paintings by Florentine artists, mostly from the period 1300–1600 (the Trecento to the Late Renaissance). It is smaller and more specialized than the Uffizi, the main art museum in Florence. It adjoins the Accademia di Belle Arti or academy of fine arts of Florence, but despite the name has no other connection with it.

In 2016, it had 1.46 million visitors, making it the second-most-visited art museum in Italy, after the Uffizi (2.02 million).

History

The Galleria dell'Accademia was founded in 1784 by Pietro Leopoldo, Grand Duke of Tuscany.

In 2001 the "Museo degli strumenti musicali" collection opened. It includes musical instruments made by Stradivarius, Niccolò Amati and Bartolomeo Cristofori which were acquired by the Florence Conservatory.

Works
The Galleria dell'Accademia has housed the original David by Michelangelo since 1873. The sculpture was allegedly brought to the Accademia for reasons of conservation, although other factors were involved in its move from its previous outdoor location on Piazza della Signoria. The original intention was to create a "Michelangelo museum", with original sculptures and drawings, to celebrate the fourth centenary of the artist's birth. Today, the gallery's small collection of Michelangelo's work includes his four unfinished Prisoners, intended for the tomb of Pope Julius II, and a statue of Saint Matthew, also unfinished. In 1939, these were joined by the Palestrina Pietà, discovered in the Barberini chapel in Palestrina, though experts now consider its attribution to Michelangelo to be dubious.

Other works on display are Florentine paintings from the 13th and 16th centuries, including works by Paolo Uccello, Domenico Ghirlandaio, Sandro Botticelli and Andrea del Sarto; and, from the High Renaissance, Giambologna's original full-size plaster modello for the Rape of the Sabine Women. As well as a number of Florentine Gothic paintings, the gallery houses the collection of Russian icons assembled by the Grand Dukes of the House of Lorraine, of which Leopoldo was one.

References

External links

 

 
1784 establishments in the Grand Duchy of Tuscany
1784 establishments in Italy
Art museums established in 1784
National museums of Italy
Sculpture galleries in Italy